Phytocoris pini is a species of plant bugs belonging to the family Miridae, subfamily Mirinae. It is absent from Azores, Canary Islands, Cyprus, Faroe Islands, Iceland, Ireland, and Portugal.

References 

Insects described in 1856
Hemiptera of Europe
Phytocoris